Wewanta was an unincorporated community located in Lincoln County, West Virginia, United States.

History
The town's unusual name is derived from a petition to secure a post office for the convenience of area residents, i.e. "We want a post office". The post office at Wewanta opened in 1903, and remained in operation until it was discontinued in 1947.

References 

Unincorporated communities in West Virginia
Unincorporated communities in Lincoln County, West Virginia